Touchstone Crag is a rugged mountain rising to 1550 meters  west of Mick Peak in the west part of the Helicopter Mountains. The abrupt south-facing cliffs of the feature also mark the northwestern extremity of the Saint Johns Range. Named by the Advisory Committee on Antarctic Names in 2007 after Steven Touchstone, a helicopter mechanic in support of the U.S. Antarctic Program at McMurdo Sound and the McMurdo Dry Valleys in nine austral field seasons, from 1999–2000 to 2007–08.

References

Mountains of Victoria Land